Allegheny Mountain is a stratigraphic ridge that extends northeast to southwest from south of Blue Knob to a saddle point at the Savage Mountain anticline. It merges with Negro Mountain just north of the Cambria County line where the Berlin-Salisbury basin expires.

The Eastern Continental Divide enters Allegheny Mountain south of Fraziers Pass and follows the Allegheny Backbone southwest where it leaves the escarpment toward the saddle point to the southeast between headwaters of Flaugherty and Wills Creeks, at which the ECD enters the Savage Mountain anticline.

References

Allegheny Mountains
Ridges of Pennsylvania
Ridges of Bedford County, Pennsylvania
Landforms of Somerset County, Pennsylvania
Landforms of Cambria County, Pennsylvania